Talamancaheros sieboldii, the Siebold's cichlid, is a species of cichlid fish found in fast- and moderately-flowing rivers on the Pacific slope of western Panama. The population in Costa Rica, which formerly was included in this species, is now recognized as T. underwoodi.

References

Heroini
Fish described in 1863
Taxa named by Rudolf Kner
Fish of Panama